The Staatsorchester Rheinische Philharmonie, also known as the Rheinische Philharmonie, is a professional symphony orchestra in Koblenz, Germany. Founded in Autumn of 1945, it was adopted as an orchestra of the German state with state tax support in 1973. It is the resident orchestra of the concert venue Rhein-Mosel-Halle in Koblenz. Former principal conductors of the orchestra include Walter May, Carl August Vogt, Claro Mizerit, Walter Crabeels, Pierre Stoll, James Lockhart, Christian Kluttig, and Garry Walker. The orchestra has an excellent reputation internationally. Conductor Benjamin Shwartz serves as the orchestra's current musical director.

References

de:Staatsorchester Rheinische Philharmonie

1945 establishments in Germany
German symphony orchestras
Musical groups established in 1945
Music in Koblenz